Ginosar is a kibbutz in the Plain of Ginosar on the western shore of the Sea of Galilee in Israel. Located north of Tiberias on Highway 90, it falls under the jurisdiction of Emek HaYarden Regional Council.

History

Roman era
In the first century AD there was a flourishing town known by Greek and Latin speakers as Gennesaret, also in the New Testament with one single verse (Matthew 14:34), where "Gennesar" is written by only a few papyri. The modern kibbutz takes its name from this ancient town, though it is not certain it is located on precisely the same site.

British Mandate
Ginosar was founded on the eve of Purim in March 1937 by a group of young Socialist Zionists, on Palestine Jewish Colonization Association (PICA) land that had been leased to the settlement of Migdal.

The reason given for "squatting" was that the leased area needed close protection during the "disturbances" (1936–1939 Arab revolt in Palestine]). The original was built as a tower and stockade settlement, and was closely aligned with the Mapai party, and was the home of Yigal Allon, commander of the "Syrian Department" of the Palmach, and later a senior minister in the Government of Israel.

State of Israel
Ginosar was originally an agricultural community; now its primary source of income is from tourism. During a severe drought in 1986 the level of lake dropped to reveal the frame of a fishing boat that has since been carbon dated to 100 BCE to 70 CE, and is now known as the Sea of Galilee Boat. Using innovative techniques the boat frame was rescued, the boat was placed in a special tank, and it is displayed in the Beit Yigal Allon Museum.

Notable people
Yigal Allon (1918–1980), politician, commander of the Palmach, and general in the IDF
Barak Lufan (1987-2022), kayaker

References

External links

Official website
Article on the Kibbutz and its history

1937 establishments in Mandatory Palestine
Kibbutzim
Kibbutz Movement
Populated places established in 1937
Populated places in Northern District (Israel)
Sea of Galilee